MPFS may refer to:

 Monty Python's Flying Circus, British comedy group
 Multi Path File System, in computing
 Metropolitan Police Friendly Society, financial services provider to the Met Police